Giorgi Babunashvili (born 15 November 1995) is a Georgian rugby union player who plays as a fly-half for AIA Kutaisi in the Didi 10 and The Black Lion in Rugby Europe Super Cup's eastern division. He was playing for Georgia 7s until 2019. In 2021 he called in Georgia national rugby union team.

Biography 
Giorgi Babunashvili came to prominence in 2013 with Bagrati Kutaisi, a Georgian second division team. With his team, he competed in a promotion play-off for the first division, which he lost. His good performances allowed him to join the main club in Kutaisi, RC AIA, during the off-season. At the end of the season, he was included in the Georgia Under-20 team for the World Junior Trophy, which he competed in again in 2015.

In 2017, he joined the Georgia Rugby Sevens team for the Seven's Grand Prix Series.
In 2017-2018, he scored over 126 points with AIA in the Georgian championship, but had to miss the finals due to injury. He was named in the league's All-Star team for the year as a fly-half.

In 2019, he returned to the sevens squad for the tournament in Russia. In 2021, he was named in the Georgia team. On the bench against Spain and Portugal, he did not play. He had to wait until the match against Russia to win his first cap.

References

1995 births
Living people
Rugby union players from Georgia (country)
Georgia international rugby union players
The Black Lion players
Rugby union fly-halves